Charles Carver Martensen (born July 31, 1988) is an American actor and screenwriter. His best known roles include Porter Scavo on the ABC television series Desperate Housewives, Ethan on the MTV television series Teen Wolf, Scott Frost on the first season of the HBO television series The Leftovers, and as Cowboy in both The Boys in the Band on Broadway and the subsequent 2020 film of the same name. His identical twin brother Max Carver has frequently portrayed the twin of his characters.

Early life
Carver was born in San Francisco, California, on July 31, 1988. His identical twin brother, Max, was born seven minutes later on August 1. Before he began acting professionally, he was known as Charlie Martensen. Charlie and Max portrayed Ethan and Aiden Steiner, and their twin sister, Layla played Layla Steiner.  His father was a physician, historian, and author Robert Martensen, and his mother, Anne Carver (b. 1952), is a philanthropist and community activist. In 1992, Anne and her new husband Denis Sutro moved the family to Calistoga in Napa Valley. Carver attended high school at St. Paul’s School in Concord, New Hampshire, but left to attend Interlochen Arts Academy in Interlochen, Michigan his sophomore year. He graduated from the University of Southern California in 2012. He also studied acting at the American Conservatory Theater in San Francisco. He came out as gay on Instagram in 2016.

Career 
Carver made his acting debut as an eighth-grader when he played fairy trickster Puck in his school's production of Shakespeare's A Midsummer Night's Dream.

His screen debut was with his brother in the ABC television series, Desperate Housewives; they played Porter and Preston Scavo, sons to Lynette Scavo and Tom Scavo. The brothers also appeared together in season 3 of Teen Wolf on MTV as a pair of twin alpha werewolves – Charlie played Ethan Steiner, and Max played Aiden Steiner; Charlie also appeared in Season 6B of the show. They also appeared in the first season of HBO series The Leftovers.

Carver has guest starred on several shows including Hawaii Five-0, and The League. His feature film roles have included Underdogs, Bad Asses, and I Am Michael.

Carver appeared in the ABC miniseries When We Rise in 2017. The production traced the history of the LGBTQ rights movement, beginning with the Stonewall riots in 1969. Carver himself came out as gay in 2016. Carver made his Broadway debut as Cowboy in the 2018 revival of Mart Crowley's The Boys in the Band and reprised the role in the 2020 film of the same name, alongside fellow openly gay actors Jim Parsons, Zachary Quinto, Matt Bomer, Andrew Rannells, Robin de Jesús, Tuc Watkins and Michael Benjamin Washington.

Carver starred in the Netflix drama series Ratched, which was released in September 2020.
In 2022, stars American Horror Story: NYC. In addition to the lead role, he also co-wrote four episodes of the season.

Filmography

Film

Television

Stage

Music videos

Awards and nominations

See also
 LGBT culture in New York City
 List of LGBT people from New York City

References

External links
 
 

American male television actors
Living people
1988 births
Identical twin male actors
LGBT people from California
21st-century American male actors
American gay actors
Male actors from San Francisco
American male film actors
American twins
21st-century American LGBT people